Peter Penashue,  (born April 9, 1964) is a Canadian politician from Newfoundland and Labrador. He was elected as the Conservative Party of Canada Member of Parliament for the riding of Labrador in the 2011 federal election. Penashue was the first Innu from Labrador to be elected to the House of Commons of Canada and the first Innu cabinet minister in Canadian history. He was also the first centre-right MP to be elected from the riding of Labrador since 1968, and only the second ever to win it since Newfoundland and Labrador joined Canada in 1949.

Following allegations of irregularities in his campaign spending, Penashue announced on March 14, 2013 that he would resign and seek to regain his seat in a by-election. In the resulting by-election, held on May 13, 2013, he was defeated by Yvonne Jones of the Liberal Party. He unsuccessfully ran again in the riding in the 2015 federal election.

Background
Penashue was born in the Innu community of Sheshatshiu, Newfoundland and Labrador. His mother Elizabeth is an author. He attended elementary and secondary school in Sheshatshiu before continuing his education in St. John's, where he graduated from Brother Rice High School and pursued studies at Memorial University of Newfoundland.

Penashue assumed a number of leadership roles in the Labrador Innu community, from Land Claims Director, Executive Director and Financial Administrator with the Naskapi Montagnais Innu to Grand Chief of the Innu Nation.

Penashue was elected President of the Innu Nation at the age of 26, and served as Grand Chief of the Innu Nation, for twelve years, from 1990 to 1997 and 1999 to 2004, and was the driving force behind the negotiation of the impacts-benefit agreement between the Innu Nation and the Voisey's Bay Nickel Company. He was also elected to the position of Deputy Grand Chief of the Innu Nation in Sheshatshiu in 2007 and stepped down on March 9, 2010.

Federal politics
Penashue was elected to the House of Commons of Canada in the 2011 Canadian federal election, in the riding of Labrador. Penashue's challenger, Liberal incumbent Todd Russell, had originally been declared by the media as retaining his seat early on election night but after the last five polls were counted Penashue overtook Russell and was ultimately declared the winner. Penashue's original margin of victory of 231 votes was reduced to 79 votes on recount.

Penashue was one of two Innu in Parliament. Jonathan Genest-Jourdain, the New Democratic MP from the neighbouring riding of Manicouagan in Quebec, was the other.

Cabinet Minister
Penashue was the Minister of Intergovernmental Affairs and President of the Queen's Privy Council for Canada from May 18, 2011 until his resignation on March 14, 2013.

2011 election campaign irregularities and aftermath
Penashue's campaign took 28 ineligible campaign contributions totaling $27,850 in cash and $18,710 in in-kind contributions from Provincial Airlines for services provided. Elections Canada deemed the contributions ineligible and Penashue's campaign was forced to pay $26,850 on November 28, 2012 and $18,710 on March 4, 2013 to the Receiver General of Canada.

After the 2011 election the Peneshue campaign had $4000 but still owed $15,000 from a $25,000 zero interest loan to the Innu Development Limited Partnership, a firm managed by his brother-in-law, Paul Rich. Interest free loans are not allowed by Canadian election law. In November 2012, the Conservative Party transferred $30,000 to the campaign and a further $14,350 on March 1, 2013.

On March 14, 2013, Penashue resigned from Parliament.  At the same time, he announced he would seek to return to his old seat via a by-election. In the resulting by-election, held on May 13, 2013, he was defeated by Yvonne Jones of the Liberal Party.

In July 2015, seven companies acknowledged that they made illegal donations to Penashue's 2011 election campaign. Penashue's official agent in the 2011 campaign, Reg Bowers, has been charged with three counts of accepting illegal corporate contributions under the Canada Elections Act. Penashue stated he feels badly for his former official agent.

On September 3, 2015, Penashue was nominated as Conservative candidate in his former riding in the 2015 Canadian federal election, again running against Yvonne Jones. He lost by a margin of over 50% and was pushed into third place.

Penashue later served as one of two Innu Nation representatives on the Independent Expert Advisory Committee examining health concerns surrounding the Muskrat Falls hydroelectric project.

Electoral history

References

External links

 

1964 births
Living people
21st-century First Nations people
Conservative Party of Canada MPs
First Nations politicians
Indigenous Members of the House of Commons of Canada
Innu people
Indigenous leaders in Atlantic Canada
Members of the 28th Canadian Ministry
Members of the House of Commons of Canada from Newfoundland and Labrador
Members of the King's Privy Council for Canada
People from Labrador